Mary Duncan (August 13, 1894 – May 9, 1993) was an American stage and film actress. She is best known for her performances in F.W. Murnau's City Girl (1930) and Morning Glory (1933).

Early years
Duncan was born in Luttrellville, Virginia, the sixth of eight children born to Capt. William  S. Duncan and his wife, Ada Thaddeus Douglass. She attended Cornell University for two years (or one year) before settling on acting as a career. When she left Cornell, she studied acting under Yvette Guilbert.

Career 
Duncan began her career as a child actress playing on the Broadway stage from 1910. Her Broadway credits include Human Nature (1925), All Wet (1925), New Toys (1924), The Egotist (1922), Face Value (1921), and Welcome to Our City (1919). In 1926 she played "Poppy" in the smash hit and controversial play The Shanghai Gesture, in which Florence Reed played her mother (known as "Mother Goddam"). Reed's character kills her daughter in a startling end to the play. This play was turned into a very sanitized film in 1941 with Gene Tierney.

Duncan also starred in the 1930 film City Girl by director F.W. Murnau. After that, her career hit a lull. An article by Florabel Muir in the New York Daily News in 1931 began: "Mary Duncan was in Hollywood nearly all of last year looking for work with little or no luck. She even altered her appearance by having things done to her nose, but still the producers wouldn't give her a tumble."

Duncan's last film appearance was in the 1933 film Morning Glory, which starred Katharine Hepburn (one of Hepburn's earliest films, for which she received the first of her four Academy Awards for Best Actress).

Personal life
On September 1, 1933, Duncan married Stephen "Laddie" Sanford, who was an international polo player as well as director of the Bigelow-Sanford Carpet Company, after which she retired from films. They remained married until his death in 1977. She spent much of her remaining years working with several major charities, and earned a reputation as a socialite in Palm Beach, Florida. She kept herself active by playing golf twice a week and swimming every morning before breakfast, which helped her maintain her size 8 figure. As an actress, she had followed the ministrations of Sylvia of Hollywood to keep her shape.

Death
Mary Duncan died in her sleep aged 98. She was survived by a niece and great-niece. Duncan was the last known person to have in her possession a copy of the lost Murnau film 4 Devils; Martin Koerber, curator of Deutsche Kinemathek, has speculated that her heirs may still have the valuable print somewhere.

Filmography

References

External links

Mary Duncan at Virtual History

1894 births
1993 deaths
20th-century American actresses
American child actresses
American film actresses
American stage actresses
People from Northumberland County, Virginia
Actresses from Virginia
Cornell University alumni